The 1920 Oregon Agricultural Aggies football team represented Oregon Agricultural College (now known as Oregon State University) in the Pacific Coast Conference (PCC) during the 1920 college football season.  The team played its home games at Bell Field in Corvallis, Oregon. Henry Rearden was the team captain.  Gap Powell was the fullback and the offensive star.

Season overview
In April 1920, R. B. "Dick" Rutherford was hired as the team's head coach. He had played football at Nebraska and had been the head football coach at Washington University from 1917 to 1919. In their first season under coach Rutherford, the Beavers compiled a 2–2–2 record (1–2–1 against PCC opponents), finished in fifth place in the PCC, and were outscored by their opponents, 52 to 20.

On October 23, 1920, the Aggies defeated Washington, 3–0, for the Aggies' first victory over Washington since 1905.  The annual rivalry game with Oregon, played at Corvallis on November 20, 1920, resulted in a scoreless tie.  The Aggies also played two games with the Multnomah Athletic Club of Portland, resulting in a win and a tie, and lost games against national champion California (17–7) and Washington State (28-0).

In January 1921, Rutherford was signed to a three-year contract as the school's coach and director of athletics.

Schedule

Players
The following players received letters for their participation on the Aggies' 1920 football team.

 Emil Christensen
 Edward Clark
 Andrew Crowell
 Charles Daigh
 Ted Heyden
 Gap Powell
 Albert "Duke" Hodler
 Clarence Johnston
 Dough Johnston
 Joe Kasberger
 Marlon McCart
 Harold McKenna
 Hugh McKenna
 Henry Rearden
 Millard Scott
 Claire R. Seely
 Robert Stewart
 Stanley Summers
 Harry Swan
 Herman Wood

References

Oregon Agricultural
Oregon State Beavers football seasons
Oregon Agricultural Aggies football